Johan R. Henriksen   (8 November 1886 – 30 September 1975) is a Norwegian Nordic skier who was awarded the Holmenkollen medal in 1938 (Shared with Reidar Andersen).

References
Holmenkollen medalists - click Holmenkollmedaljen for downloadable pdf file 

Holmenkollen medalists
1886 births
1975 deaths